The Local Government Act 1995 is an act of the Western Australian Parliament which lays down the responsibilities, powers and procedures for election of Local Government Bodies. It replaced and amended the Local Government Act 1960.

External links
Text of the law

Western Australia legislation
Local government legislation in Australia
1995 in Australian law
1990s in Western Australia
Local government in Western Australia
History of local government in Australia